Sze Irene Ng (born July 28, 1974) is an American actress, teacher, banker and founder and director of Mencius Mandarin Preschool in Greenwich, Connecticut. She is best known for her role as Shelby Woo in The Mystery Files of Shelby Woo.

Early life and education
Ng was born July 28, 1974 in Penang, Malaysia. She moved from Malaysia to Allentown, Pennsylvania in 1989, at age 15, with her parents and her sister and brother. She attended Allentown's William Allen High School. At age 16, she was discovered by television agents when she won a Pennsylvania beauty contest. She is a graduate of Harvard University.

Career
Ng has had starring roles on All My Children, The Mystery Files of Shelby Woo, and Figure It Out. She has guest starred on Law & Order and Teen Angel.  She also has appeared in several movies, including The Joy Luck Club, Oliver Stone's Heaven & Earth, and The Sterling Chase.

In addition to her acting career, Ng has served as a banker at Merrill Lynch. She currently is director of at Mencius Mandarin Preschool.

Personal life
In 2008, Ng married David Rosa. She resides in Greenwich, Connecticut.

Filmography

Film

Television

References

External links

1974 births
20th-century American actresses
Actresses from Allentown, Pennsylvania
American child actresses
American film actresses
American investment bankers
American people of Chinese descent
American television actresses
Harvard University alumni
Living people
Malaysian people of Chinese descent
Malaysian emigrants to the United States
Merrill (company) people
Actresses from Greenwich, Connecticut
Educators from Allentown, Pennsylvania
People from Penang
William Allen High School alumni
People who lost Malaysian citizenship
21st-century American women